Muhammad ibn Muqatil ibn Hakim al-Akki was a provincial governor for the Abbasid Caliphate. Appointed to Ifriqiya in 797, he was the last Provincial governor of that province prior to the establishment of the Aghlabid Governor dynasty in 800.

Career 
The son of Muqatil ibn Hakim al-Akki, a supporter of the Abbasid Revolution, Muhammad himself was a foster brother of the caliph Harun al-Rashid (r. 786–809). In 797 Harun appointed him to Ifriqiya, as a replacement for Harthamah ibn A'yan. Arriving at the provincial capital al-Qayrawan in late October or early November, his administration quickly ran into problems due to his bad conduct, and his relations with the jund (local army) soon became strained. Eventually a rebellion led by Makhlad ibn Murrah al-Azdi and supported by members of the jund and the local Berbers broke out, but Muhammad dispatched an army which defeated the rebels and killed Makhlad.

In October 799 a new revolt led by Tammam ibn Tamim al-Tamimi was launched in Tunis and quickly gathered a large degree of support. As the rebels marched toward al-Qayrawan, Muhammad went out to meet them, but he was defeated and forced to retreat back into the city. Tammam, however, continued his advance and entered al-Qayrawan. Muhammad was given a guarantee of safety by the rebels on the condition that he departed from Ifriqiya; accepting the arrangement, he departed and made his way to Tripoli.

Shortly after his exile, Muhammad received a letter from Ibrahim ibn al-Aghlab, the governor of the Zab, informing him that he had expelled Tammam from al-Qayrawan and inviting him to return to the province; Muhammad consequently was able to resume his governorship. A fresh attempt was soon made by Tammam, who had fled to Tunis, to overthrow Muhammad, but Ibrahim defeated him again and gained his submission.

Muhammad's restored rule over Ifriqiya did not last for long. His continuing unpopularity among his subjects led to Ibrahim writing to Harun al-Rashid, telling him of the hatred for Muhammad and asking to be appointed over Ifriqiya in exchange for certain financial guarantees. Harun granted this request; Muhammad was dismissed and Ibrahim became the first governor of the Aghlabid dynasty.

See also
 Umar ibn Hafs Hazarmard
 Yazid ibn Hatim al-Muhallabi
 Isa ibn Musa

Notes

References 
 
 
 
 
 

8th-century rulers in Africa
Abbasid governors of Ifriqiya
8th-century births
9th-century deaths
8th-century Arabs
8th-century people of Ifriqiya